Hadwala Gujaran is a village in the Islamabad Capital Territory of Pakistan.

Etymology

Hadwala is composed of two words from Pothwari/Punjabi language; had means "half" and wala means "owner", so Hadwala means "owner of half". This name was given because the head of this village who belonged to Gujjar tribe owned half the lands of the area around this village in Union Council Bishandot.

The major population of the village consists of Gujar tribe.

The road has been established since 2013.

Politics

Hadwala Gujaran is situated in provincial constituency of Punjab (PP7) and NA 52 is the constituency for national assembly. Muslim League(N) currently has a strong hold on these constituencies before last general elections in 2018. Pakistan Tehrik Insaf (PTI) won both provincial and national assembly seats during the election of 2018. PTI is very famous in young generation of the area. Hadwala gujaran is situated in District Rawalpindi, tehsil Kallar Syedan and Union council Bishandot.

Surroundings

Chowk Pindori, Sagri, and Kallar Syedan are the nearest towns. Rawat is also nearby town to reach GT road. Mankiala Joor Road is also an easy joining point for travel towards Gujar Khan. Bhatta, Aziz Pur Gujaran, Mohra Najar, Arazi Khas, Roopar, and Bishandot are nearby villages.

Map and location
https://www.google.co.uk/maps/place/Hadwala+Gujaran,+Pakistan/@33.4430333,73.2965273,392m/data=!3m1!1e3!4m2!3m1!1s0x38dff9f2452283b7:0x68041c0e0193cead
 http://mapcarta.com/14559540
 http://www.gomapper.com/travel/map-of/hadwala-gujaran.html

References

Union councils of Islamabad Capital Territory